Blaine Saunders (born June 25, 1993) is an American actress best known for her recurring role as Carly on The Middle.

Saunders' character of Carly on The Middle was one of Sue Heck's (Eden Sher) best friends, appearing in 25 episodes beginning in season 1. She was promoted to "guest star" by 2010. Following one appearance in season 6, she didn't appear again until having a brief cameo role in season 9's "New Year's Revelations". For the role, she was nominated at the 32nd Young Artist Awards for Best Performance in a TV Series - Recurring Young Actress 17-21.

She also played Becky, a Werepanther, in four episodes of True Blood in 2011. Previous roles included Malcolm in the Middle, Days of Our Lives, and Medium. She had co-star status in ABC pilot A House Divided. Dylan McDermott was the series lead.

Saunders starred as the titular character in Janie, a short film about an only child whose life is shattered when a brother she never knew existed shows up to live with the family. The film screened at festivals internationally, from 2006 to 2009, winning a variety of awards.

She is engaged, as of 2016.

References

External links

Facebook fan page
 "The Fetch", a short film with Saunders

1993 births
Living people
21st-century American actresses
Actresses from Oklahoma
American television actresses
American child actresses